John Fawcett Gordon PC(NI) (13 May 1879 – 21 June 1965) was a politician in Northern Ireland.

Son of William James Gordon and Margaret Fawcett. Husband of Charlotte Banks.
Born in the Belfast area, Gordon was sent to live with relatives in the US after his father died and was educated at Falls River School, Massachusetts, United States. He was manager of flax camps and a member of Belfast Corporation from 1920 to 1923. He was the Ulster Unionist Party Member of Parliament (MP) in the Northern Ireland parliament for Antrim and then Carrick from 1921 to 1943.

He served as Minister of Labour (Northern Ireland) from 1938 to 1943. Prior to that, he was Parliamentary Secretary to the Minister of Labour from 1921. He served as Chairman of the National Assistance Board of Northern Ireland from 1943 to 1956 when he retired, although  he was serving as Governor's Deputy as late as 1964

References

Sources
 http://www.election.demon.co.uk/stormont/biographies.html
 http://planet4589.org/jcm/pics/family/index.html
 Jonathan McDowell's family archives

 

1879 births
1965 deaths
Ulster Unionist Party members of the House of Commons of Northern Ireland
Members of the Privy Council of Northern Ireland
Members of the House of Commons of Northern Ireland 1921–1925
Members of the House of Commons of Northern Ireland 1925–1929
Members of the House of Commons of Northern Ireland 1929–1933
Members of the House of Commons of Northern Ireland 1933–1938
Members of the House of Commons of Northern Ireland 1938–1945
Northern Ireland Cabinet ministers (Parliament of Northern Ireland)
Northern Ireland junior government ministers (Parliament of Northern Ireland)
Members of the House of Commons of Northern Ireland for County Antrim constituencies